Catorhintha flava is a species of leaf-footed bug in the family Coreidae. It is found in Central America & North America.

References

Coreini
Articles created by Qbugbot
Insects described in 1923